Scandium-44 (44Sc) is a radioactive isotope of scandium that decays by positron emission to  stable 44Ca with a half-life of 4.042 hours.

44Sc can be obtained as a daughter radionuclide of long-lived 44Ti (t1/2 60.4 a) from 44Ti /44Sc  generator or can be produced by nuclear reaction 44Ca ( p, n)44Sc in small cyclotrons. This isotope is of potential interest for clinical PET imaging.

Applications

Titanium-44 generation

44Ti with its long half-life of ca. 60 years provides a cyclotron-independent source of 44Sc  for several decades.
44Ti is obtained in the nuclear reaction 45Sc(p,2n)44Ti and it transforms directly into the ground state of 44Sc  via electron capture, emitting low energetic photons at 67.9 keV and 78.3 keV.

The 44Ti /44Sc generator represents a secular equilibrium system with a half-life ratio between parent and daughter of ca. 130 000. Consequently, 50% of saturation activity is generated every 3.97 hours, and identical 44Sc batch activities very close to saturation may be eluted each day. >97% elution efficacy for 44Sc and very low breakthrough of < 5*10−5 % of 44Ti.

44Ti is adsorbed onto column filled with anion-exchange resin. 44Sc is eluted with 20 mL
of 0.005M H2C2O4/0.07M HCl solution. The eluate is directly post-processed on miniaturized column filled with cation-exchange resin where 44Sc is quantitatively adsorbed online and successively eluted using 2–3 mL of 0.25 M ammonium acetate buffer (pH 4.0). This 44Sc solution of small volume and free of competing oxalates can be used for further labelling studies.
small cyclotrons.

Scandium-44 as a PET tracer

44Sc complexates with DOTA, a well-established bifunctional chelators conjugated  to peptides or other molecular targeting vectors, its half-life of 4 h, a high positron branching, stable and non-toxic decay product and being generator-produced makes it an appropriate candidate in PET/CT diagnosis.
44Sc has an almost 4-times longer half-life and higher β+ branching than commonly used 68Ga, therefore it can be used for more accurate planning and dosimetric calculations being able to cover imaging periods of more than one day.
A specific field might be application of diagnostic 44Sc tracers for matching therapeutic analog compounds labelled with another radioisotope such as 90Y, 177Lu or with the β− emitter 47Sc.

Recent studies with 44Sc-DOTA-conjugated tumor targeting vectors such as octreotides, showed in vitro and in vivo stability and revealed pharmacological parameters adequate to long-term (up to one day) molecular imaging. Initial human studies with 44Sc-DOTATOC PET/CT imaging of somatostatin receptor positive liver metastases in a patient at early time-points (40 min p.i.) showed comparable results to 68Ga-DOTATATE(90 min. p.i.) in the same patient.

See also
 Isotopes of scandium

References

 Scandium-44: Benefits of a Long-Lived PET Radionuclide Available from the 44Ti/44Sc Generator System. F.Rösch
 Radiolabeling of DOTATOC with the long-lived positron emitter 44Sc. M.Pruszynski, A.Majkowska-Pilip, N.Loktionova, E.Eppard, F.Roesch

Isotopes of scandium